Ian John Knight (born 26 October 1966) is a former professional footballer who played as a defender. He played for Sheffield Wednesday and Grimsby Town before retiring due to injuries.

Playing career
Knight began his career promisingly. He established himself in the first-team at Sheffield Wednesday, and was capped twice for the England under-21s.

Injury
Knight was badly injured on 4 February 1987 in a FA Cup replay against Chester City. Two minutes into the game a poor tackle by Gary Bennett left Knight's leg broken in seven places. Although he recovered from the injury, Knight lost his place in the first-team and was sold to Grimsby Town. However, recurring injury problems limited him to only 21 appearances in two years and he left the club in 1992. He then had a brief spell at Carlisle United, appearing once in the league before dropping into non-league football, where he played for Boston United and Grantham Town before deciding to retire.

He later sought £1.5 million damages against Bennett for the incident. In 1997, Knight settled the case out of court with Chester City. It was the first time a professional footballer had successfully claimed compensation for a career-ending injury.

Post-playing career
Shortly after retiring, Knight worked on a youth programme at Grimsby. When his contract with Grimsby ended, he moved to Canada where he coached youth teams at the Greater London Soccer Club. In April 2010, he was appointed head coach of the Abbotsford Mariners.

Career statistics
Source:

References

External links
 Career statistics

1966 births
Living people
English footballers
England under-21 international footballers
Association football defenders
Barnsley F.C. players
Sheffield Wednesday F.C. players
Scunthorpe United F.C. players
Grimsby Town F.C. players
Carlisle United F.C. players
Boston United F.C. players
Grantham Town F.C. players
English Football League players
Grimsby Town F.C. non-playing staff